Ivan Dérer (2 March 1884 in Malacka, Kingdom of Hungary – 10 March 1973 in Prague, Czechoslovakia) was a prominent Slovak politician, lawyer, journalist and regional chairman of the Czechoslovak Social Democratic Workers' Party in Slovakia. Serving in 1920 as Minister for Administration of Slovakia, in 1939 to 1934 as Minister of Education and from 1934 to 1938 as Minister of Justice. He was one of the signers of Martin Declaration in 1918. His son, Vladimir Derer was a prominent British Labour Party activist who founded the influential Campaign for Labour Party Democracy.

References

External links 
 Ivan Dérer, malackepohlady.sk

1884 births
1973 deaths
People from Malacky
People from the Kingdom of Hungary
Czech Social Democratic Party politicians
National Labour Party (1938) politicians
Labour Party (Slovakia) politicians
Education ministers
Justice ministers of Czechoslovakia
Government ministers of Czechoslovakia
Members of the Revolutionary National Assembly of Czechoslovakia
Members of the Chamber of Deputies of Czechoslovakia (1920–1925)
Members of the Chamber of Deputies of Czechoslovakia (1925–1929)
Members of the Chamber of Deputies of Czechoslovakia (1929–1935)
Members of the Chamber of Deputies of Czechoslovakia (1935–1939)
Budapest University alumni
Recipients of the Order of Tomáš Garrigue Masaryk